Gräfin Mariza is a 1958 West German musical film directed by Rudolf Schündler and starring Rudolf Schock, Christine Görner, and Gunther Philipp. It is based on the operetta Gräfin Mariza by Emmerich Kálmán, Julius Brammer and Alfred Grünwald.

Main cast

References

Bibliography

External links

1958 films
1958 musical films
German musical films
West German films
1950s German-language films
Films directed by Rudolf Schündler
Operetta films
Films based on operettas
Films set in Hungary
Constantin Film films
1950s German films